Sancta may refer to:

Scala Sancta, a set of 28 white marble steps that are Roman Catholic relics located in an edifice on extraterritorial property of the Holy See in Rome, Italy
Sancta Susanna, an early opera by Paul Hindemith in one act
Sancta Civitas, an oratorio by Ralph Vaughan Williams
Sancta Sanctorum, a Roman Catholic chapel entered via the Scala Sancta
Sancta Sapientia or Hagia Sophia, Istanbul, Turkey
Silvester Petra Sancta (1590–1647), Italian Jesuit priest, and heraldist

See also
Sancta Maria (disambiguation)